Craig Clare (born 19 August 1984) is a New Zealand rugby union player who currently plays for Wanganui in the Heartland Championship. He also played for the Highlanders in the Super Rugby competition, before a broken leg stalled his career and caused a long injury layoff.

Playing career

New Zealand

Clare made his debut for Manawatu in 2003, and spent two seasons for the province before transferring to Otago in 2005 in the hopes of earning a Super Rugby contract with the Highlanders.

After a strong 2006, Clare was included in the Highlanders squad for the 2007 Super 14 season. Aged only 22, his Super Rugby career was off to a highly promising start as he started 4 of the team's first 5 games of the season. However, his career came to a crashing halt on 2 March in a game against the Blues when he suffered a compound fracture to his leg. Clare's leg injury forced a two-year layoff from the sport, and he didn't play again until 2009.

After a stint in Italy, Clare returned to New Zealand in 2010 and signed back with Manawatu. He proceeded to start all 13 games of the 2010 season for the Turbos, primarily at his preferred position of fullback.

Clare signed for Bay of Plenty in 2015.

He joined Heartland Championship (2nd tier) team Steelform Wanganui in 2016.

Europe

After a long injury layoff, Clare returned to high level rugby in 2009, signing with Rugby Viadana of the Italian Super 10 (now Top12). He enjoyed a solid season in Italy, but fell victim to import restrictions when the club joined the Celtic League as Aironi.

Clare spent the 2010–11 season with Spanish side Bera Bera RT before returning to Manawatu again for the 2011 provincial campaign in New Zealand.

In 2013 he signed with Russian club Krasny Yar on a 6-month contract.

References

1984 births
Living people
Rugby union players from Palmerston North
New Zealand rugby union players
Manawatu rugby union players
Otago rugby union players
Bay of Plenty rugby union players
Highlanders (rugby union) players
New Zealand expatriate rugby union players
New Zealand expatriate sportspeople in Italy
Expatriate rugby union players in Italy
Rugby Viadana players
Rugby union centres